Special Senate elections were held on 26 November 1966 to elect members to fill casual vacancies in the Australian Senate for the states of New South Wales, Victoria, Queensland and Western Australia.

Prior to 29 July 1977, the filing of casual vacancies was complex. While senators were elected for a six-year term, people appointed to a casual vacancy only held office until the earlier of the next election for the House of Representatives or the Senate, at which the vacancy would be filled by the electors of the relevant state.

This was one of the few occasions in which there was a special election for the Senate, as the House of Representatives and Senate elections had got out of synchronisation as a result of Robert Menzies calling an early House-only election in 1963.

Because of the loss of a seat in Western Australia,  the Coalition held less than half of the seats in the chamber; the Democratic Labor Party and independent senator Reg Turnbull held the balance of power.

Australia

New South Wales

Queensland

Victoria

Western Australia

Changing seats

See also 

 Candidates of the 1966 Australian federal election
 Members of the Australian Senate, 1965–1968

References 

Australian Senate elections
1964 elections in Australia
December 1964 events in Australia